Espita Municipality is one of the 106 subdivisions of the State of Yucatán in Mexico. Its municipal seat is located in the City of Espita and is located on the Litoral Oriente (East Coast) or Region 1 of the state. In 2005, the municipality had the 77th highest HDI in the state with 0.7320, the same as Honduras in 2007.

Location
This municipality is located in the eastern-part of the state.  It is located between latitudes 20° 53' and 21° 08' north and longitudes 88° 16' and 88° 27' west.

It borders the following municipalities: to the north Sucilá to the south Tinum and Uayma, on the east Temozón and Calotmul and the west Dzitas - Cenotillo.

Demography

Education

Communities 
The Espita municipality has 17 communities and the municipal seat. In 2005, only 7 of its 17 communities had more than 200 inhabitants. Together these 7 communities had a population of 3,605, which together with the municipal seat (10,758), was 14,363, i.e. the 99.52% of the total municipal population.

Landmarks

Architectural 
Landmarks include:
St. Joseph's Temple, built in the eighteenth century.
The former Franciscan convent, built at the beginning of the sixteenth century.
The Municipal Palace.

Archaeological
The area called Pom.

References

Municipalities of Yucatán